Betsy Thomas (born 1966) is an American television writer and producer living in Los Angeles, California with her husband, writer and actor Adrian Wenner.

Thomas is best known as the creator of the sitcom My Boys that debuted on the cable television network TBS November 28, 2006.  She is a writer and executive producer on the show. She also created and executive-produced the short-lived sitcom Run of the House, which aired from September 2003 to May 2004 on The WB. Thomas was also one of the producers of NBC's sitcom, Whitney.

In 2019, Thomas joined other WGA members in firing her agents as part of the Guild's stand against the ATA after the two sides were unable to come to an agreement on a new "Code of Conduct" that addressed the practice of packaging.

Thomas was raised in Franklin, Michigan, with seven brothers and sisters. She attended Detroit Country Day School.

Filmography

Film

Television

References

External links

People from Franklin, Michigan
Detroit Country Day School alumni
Living people
American women screenwriters
Screenwriters from Michigan
American television writers
American women television writers
20th-century American screenwriters
20th-century American women writers
21st-century American screenwriters
21st-century American women writers
American women television producers
Television producers from Michigan
1966 births